The Wankhede Stadium is a cricket stadium in Mumbai, India. The stadium now has a capacity of 33,108, following renovations for the 2011 Cricket World Cup. Before the upgrade, the capacity was approximately 45,000.

The Wankhede has been host to numerous high-profile cricket matches in the past, most notable being the 2011 Cricket World Cup Final, in which India defeated Sri Lanka by 6 wickets. The stadium witnessed the last match of Sachin Tendulkar's international career. Additionally, it has hosted many other matches in both the 1996 as well as 2011 Cricket World Cup. The stadium is also the host to the match in which Ravi Shastri hit six sixes in an over. As of 19 July 2017, it has hosted 25 Tests, 20 ODIs and 5 T20Is.

Key

Tests

One Day Internationals

Women's Test Matches

Women's One-Day Internationals

Notes

References

External links

Wankhede Stadium
Indian cricket lists